Nicolas George Hayek (19 February 1928 – 28 June 2010), was a Swiss businessman of Lebanese descent, and the co-founder, CEO and Chairman of the Board of The Swatch Group.

Early life and education
Hayek was born the second of three children, to Lebanese parents from Greek Orthodox Christian Lebanese families. His father trained as a dentist at Loyola University Chicago. He had an older sister, Mona, and a younger brother, Sam. Hayek studied mathematics, physics, and chemistry at the University of Lyon.

Personal life
Hayek met Marianne Mezger, an au pair and the daughter of Swiss industrialist Eduard Mezger, in Beirut in 1950. They married in 1951 and moved to Switzerland. They had two children, Nayla and G. Nicolas "Nick" Jr. In 1964, the family moved to Meisterschwanden, a village west of Zürich. Hayek lived there for the rest of his life. Hayek was awarded the title of Doctor honoris causa of Law and Economics of the Faculty of Beni Culturali of the University of Bologna (Italy) in June 1998, after being awarded doctor honoris causa of Law and Economics of the University of Neuchatel in 1996.

In the year of his death, 2010, Hayek had an estimated net worth of $3.9 billion.

Early career
Hayek worked as an actuary for Swiss Re, before briefly managing his ailing father-in-law's engineering company.

Hayek Engineering
Hayek founded Hayek Engineering, a management consulting firm, in Zürich in 1963. He advised successful turnarounds at several of Europe's largest companies. One of his management credos was: "The rarest resources are entrepreneurial types in top management." Hayek Engineering had more than 300 clients in 30 countries by 1979.

Swatch Group

In the early 1980s a group of Swiss banks asked Hayek to oversee the liquidation of ASUAG and SSIH, two Swiss watch-making firms that were in turmoil due to competition from Japan. Hayek believed the Swiss watch manufacturing industry could be competitive and that restructuring operations and repositioning brands would help ASUAG/SSIH recover.

Hayek identified problems in products, policies, distribution, and leadership. "ASUAG for example owned more than 100 separate companies – some big, some small, some modern, some backward. Most of these companies did their own marketing, R&D and assembly. It was crazy."

He invested in automation and standardised parts and tooling. This produced economies of scale, improved quality, and allowed production to be centralized.

The restructuring of the companies coincided with the invention of the Swatch watch. Its colorful appearance and marketing helped Switzerland regain a large share of the lower end of the watch market from Japanese makers.   The design used almost half the number of parts of a traditional wristwatch to reduce cost without compromising on quality. 

After the reorganisation ASUAG and SSIH merged, initially becoming the Société Suisse de Microélectronique et d'Horlogerie. Hayek and Swiss investors bought a majority shareholding in the new group in 1985. Hayek became chairman and chief executive officer in 1986. His business strategies helped the Swiss watch industry regain its market leading position.

Hayek is also credited with a fundamental role in the creation of the Smart Car with Mercedes-Benz. The name "Smart" was derived by adding the first letters of Swatch and Mercedes to the word "art".

Hayek's son Nick Jr. became the CEO of the Swatch Group in 2003. Nicholas Hayek remained Chair Swatch Group's board until his death. His daughter Nayla succeeded him as chairperson.

Death
Hayek died of a cardiac arrest while working at the Swatch Group headquarters on 28 June 2010.

Press
Harvard Business Review, March–April 1993. Message and Muscle: An Interview with Swatch Titan Nicolas Hayek
Wall Street Journal Interview, June 2010. Nicolas Hayek: Time Bandit

Video
Video (French), TSR Interview, 1988
Video, CBC Interview from the 1990s, Part 1
Video, CBC Interview from the 1990s, Part 2
Video (French), Q&A with L'Hebdo, May 2009
Video (French), Pardonnez-moi, L'Interview de Darius Rochebin
Video (French), TSR News Report, June 2010

References 

1928 births
2010 deaths
The Swatch Group
Hayak
Lebanese people of American descent
Eastern Orthodox Christians from Lebanon
Lebanese billionaires
Swiss businesspeople
Lebanese emigrants to Switzerland
People from Koura District
People from Biel/Bienne
Antiochian Greek Christians